Emily Mann may refer to:

Emily Mann (model), model with the Pineal Eye Agency
Emily Mann (director) (born 1952), artistic director of McCarter Theatre